Year of the Phoenix is a role-playing game published by Fantasy Games Unlimited in 1986.

Description
Year of the Phoenix is a near-future science-fiction system in which the players' "Training Manual" (48 pages) prepares them to be soldiers, members of the United States Space Command – but from the beginning they are transported into the future of 2197, where the Russians occupy North America and are opposed by only a few small bands of freedom fighters. The "Adventure Guide" (80 pages), the GM's rulebook, describes a fairly complex skill-based system. Players assign points to various "Skill Spheres" to emphasize the skills they want. There are two scenarios, one introductory. The game includes a GM's screen, a player handout, pregenerated character sheets, a map, combat grid, and vehicle counters.

Publication history
Year of the Phoenix was designed by Martin Wixted, and was published in 1986 by Fantasy Games Unlimited as a boxed set with an 80-page book, a 48-page book, a cardstock screen, eight sheets, two cardstock counter sheets, a map, and dice.

Year of the Phoenix was the last new role-playing game published by FGU. In 1987 and 1988, FGU published its final supplements for Aftermath!, Space Opera, Villains and Vigilantes, and Year of the Phoenix, and the company ceased publication thereafter.

Reception
Lee McCormick reviewed Year of the Phoenix in Space Gamer/Fantasy Gamer No. 82. McCormick commented that "All in all, I found the game and its components attractive, easy to read, and well organized. The gamemastering guidelines were instructional and invaluable. The game's initial premise is exciting and the 'twist' makes Year of the Phoenix a must for space gamers and patriots."

Reviews
Stardate (Volume 3, Issue 4 - Summer 1987)

References

Fantasy Games Unlimited games
Role-playing games introduced in 1986
Science fiction role-playing games